Fragneto may refer to 2 Italian municipalities of the Province of Benevento:

Fragneto l'Abate
Fragneto Monforte